Stiftung Louisenlund is a privately run boarding school for boys and girls in Güby, Schleswig-Holstein, Germany.

History
The school's main building is in Louisenlund Castle, which was built by Hermann von Motz between 1772 and 1776 for Prince Charles of Hesse-Kassel as a gift for his wife, Princess Louise of Denmark, the daughter of King Frederick V of Denmark.

Louisenlund later became part of the property owned by the dukes of Schleswig-Holstein-Sonderburg-Glücksburg, who remodeled the castle to its present state. An English traveler, Horace Marryat, wrote in 1860, "Louisenlund is a charming residence in summer time, with its dark beech woods, in spring a carpet of lilies, herb-paris, hepaticas; and the bright blue waters of its deep fiordes, waters which could reveal sad tales".

Advised by Kurt Hahn, in 1949 Friedrich Wilhelm, Duke of Schleswig-Holstein-Sonderburg-Glücksburg decided to build a boarding school on the grounds and established the Louisenlund Foundation. A foundation set up to administer the Stiftung Louisenlund, a member of the Round Square Conference of Schools.

References

External links
 School homepage

Schools in Schleswig-Holstein
Round Square schools
Boarding schools in Germany
Girls' schools in Germany